Arthur James Branighan (born 1943) is an Australian former rugby league footballer who played in the 1960s and 1970s.

Playing career
A local junior from the Redfern United Club, Branighan was graded with South Sydney in 1963 and went on to play nine seasons with the club between 1963-1971.

He was approached by legendary junior coach, former international Clem Kennedy to play Presidents Cup for South Sydney in 1962, and his career went on from there. 

After an illustrious career at Souths, which included two premiership victories in 1968 and 1970 a groin injury forced his retirement in 1972. Branighan was also a member of Souths unsuccessful Grand Final team of 1965 and was a non playing reserve for the 1969 and 1971 Grand Final teams. He is the brother of fellow South Sydney player, Ray Branighan.

References

South Sydney Rabbitohs players
Australian rugby league players
Living people
1943 births
Rugby league centres
Date of birth missing (living people)
Rugby league players from Sydney